Rompetrol is a crude oil development, producer, and refiner based in Romania. It also markets and distributes refined petroleum products through its chain of gasoline and diesel fuel stations. Established as a state-owned company in 1974, it was privatized in 1993 and became a subsidiary of KMG International in 2007. It has operations in 12 countries, where it is known as The Rompetrol Group N.V.

History
Rompetrol was established in 1974 as the operator of the Romanian oil industry.

The company was privatized in 1993 through a Management and Employee Buyout (MEBO), and turnover subsequently reduced to below $6 million by 1998. In 1998, Rompetrol was purchased by a local investor group led by Dinu Patriciu, thus increasing company capital and contributing into a substantial turnover growth. In 1999, the company's new holding was established as The Rompetrol Group N.V.(TRG) in the Netherlands. The new group made its first major acquisition: Vega refinery - located in Ploieşti - which doubled its revenues in the first nine months after takeover.

In 2000, Rompetrol took over Petros (renamed Rompetrol Well Services), then Romania's principal oilfield operator. The Group's largest acquisition, Petromidia S.A., was also Romania's largest and most sophisticated oil refinery. Rompetrol committed itself to a sustained modernization process to make Petromidia a state-of-the-art facility in Eastern and Central Europe. In 2001, Rompetrol created Rominserv S.A., Romania's first Engineering Procurement Construction & Maintenance (EPCM) company focused on the oil industry. In 2002, the Petromedia refinery resumed its petrochemicals production under the management of the newly-founded Rompetrol Petrochemicals.

In 2002, Rompetrol opened subsidiaries in neighboring Moldova (Rompetrol Moldova) and Bulgaria (Rompetrol Bulgaria). The following year, in Romania, Rompetrol started to expand its gas station network. As part of its strategy, the company unified the quality standards for its entire gas station network. To expand its network and make the process of distributing fuel easier, Rompetrol created a network of oil depots in various regions of the country (Arad, Craiova, Șimleu Silvaniei, Zarnesti, Vatra-Dornei, Constanta, Mogosoaia). In 2004, Rompetrol Rafinare S.A. was listed on the Bucharest Stock Exchange (BVB). In 2005, Rompetrol started operations in Georgia and announced the acquisition of 100% of the French company Dyneff S.A. In 2006, Rompetrol opened a subsidiary in Ukraine (Rompetrol Ukraine).

In August 2007, the Kazakh company KazMunayGas acquired 75% of the Rompetrol shares from Rompetrol Holding Switzerland, and the remaining 25% stake in Rompetrol in 2009. In 2008, Rompetrol and KazMunayGas launched Media Marine Terminal for crude oil in the Media Black Sea port. In August 2009, Rompetrol opened its first two fuel stations on the A2 motorway in Romania, designed as the new premium brand of the group

In 2009, the company decided to outsource its IT needs but contracted only a single outsourcer with a multimillion dollar deal. In 2010-2011, Rompetrol was established in Turkey (RG Petrol A.S.). The Petromidia refinery modernization process was completed in 2012 following an investment of US$380 million. A new filling station concept was launched in 2013.

In 2014, the Rompetrol Group N.V. was renamed into KMG International N.V. as part of a strategy to promote the brand KazMunayGas. Although the name was changed into KMG International, the Rompetrol brand continues to be used in the distribution segment of the entire company. The company's retail network that operates under the “Rompetrol” brand incorporates over 1,100 fuel distribution points in Romania, Georgia, Bulgaria, Moldova, in France and Spain, where the company operates also under Dyneff brand.

In 2015-2016, CEFC China Energy and KazMunayGaz agreed for CEFC China Energy to take over 51% stake in KMG International, the former Rompetrol Group, but by July 2018 the deal fell apart due to the difficult financial situation of the Chinese company.

In May 2017, Rompetrol invested $10 millions to develop hybrid gas stations.

See also
List of petroleum companies

References

External links
Rompetrol Group N.V.

Oil and gas companies of Romania
Companies based in Bucharest
Companies listed on the Bucharest Stock Exchange
Romanian brands